Alexander McConachie (7 July 1840 – 18 March 1913) was a prominent Scottish merchant in Hong Kong and the member of the Legislative Council.

McConachie was born on 7 July 1840 in Glenrinnes, Banffshire, Scotland. He went to Hong Kong and was the partner of the Gilman & Co. and was the chairman of the Hong Kong General Chamber of Commerce in 1896, chairman of the Hongkong and Shanghai Banking Corporation, chairman of the China Fire Insurance Company at different times. He was also the representative of the Chamber of Commerce in the Legislative Council.

He died on 18 March 1913 at Mar Gate, Stirling, Scotland and the funeral took place on 20 March at Stirling Cemetery.

References

1840 births
1913 deaths
Hong Kong businesspeople
Hong Kong people of Scottish descent
Chairmen of HSBC
Members of the Legislative Council of Hong Kong
19th-century Scottish businesspeople